Oulimata Sarr is current Minister of Economy, Planning and Cooperation of Senegal. From 2019 to 2022, she served as Regional Director for UN Women, the United Nations entity mandated for gender equality and empowerment of women, in 24 countries in West and Central Africa.

Early life and education
Oulimata Sarr was born on January 6, 1970, in Dakar, Senegal but studied in Montreal, Canada. She graduated from the École des Hautes études Commerciales de Montréal (HEC Montréal) with a bachelor's degree in 1992, and after a period of further study at the University of Bedfordshire in Britain, graduated with a Master of Business Administration in 2002. Sarr spent ten years at the International Finance Corporation, a member institution of the World Bank Group, prior to joining the United Nations. She also worked as a Senior Auditor with Ernst & Young Senegal.

Career
In 2017, she was invited by Vital Voices to join the Global Ambassadors Program as a mentor for women entrepreneurs around the world. She recently joined 75 African women as the founding member of Women Investment Club of Senegal which was set up in 2016 to provide long-term capital to women entrepreneurs in Senegal.

From 1993 to 2005, she served as the Chief Financial Officer (CFO) of a South African based airline named Interair South Africa

Oulimata Sarr has been the Jury President of the Cartier Women's Initiative Awards business plan competition for Sub Saharan Africa and has served on the Advisory Board of UnitLife.

On September 17, 2022, she became Minister of Economy, Planning and Cooperation, within the Ba Government. This is the first time in Senegal that a woman has held this ministerial position..

References

External links
 Profile at Cartier Women's Initiative
 Interview with Women's Deliver
 Vital Voices Global Ambassador
 Founding member of the Women's Investment Club Senegal
 Nomination Letter 2019

Living people
Senegalese officials of the United Nations
Senegalese businesspeople
Year of birth missing (living people)